Linares is one of nine parishes (administrative divisions) in Ribadesella, a municipality within the province and autonomous community of Asturias, in northern Spain.

Villages
Alea
Calabrez
Linares

Parishes in Ribadesella